Răzvan Marian Burleanu (born 1 July 1984) is the president of the Romanian Football Federation.

Career
Burleanu was elected president of the Romanian Football Federation (FRF) on 5 March 2014. He was previously the head of the European Minifootball Federation (EMF) from 25 March 2012 until January 2017.

Personal life
Burleanu is the son of former football midfielder Gheorghe Burleanu, who totalled 352 Divizia A matches and scored 49 goals for FC Olt Scornicești, FCM Târgoviște, Dacia Unirea Brăila, FCM Bacău and Ceahlăul Piatra Neamț.

References

External links
Curriculum vitae at the SNSPA

1984 births
Living people
Sportspeople from Focșani
Presidents of the Romanian Football Federation
Romanian sports executives and administrators